Do You Come Here Often? is a 1997 play written by Sean Foley and Hamish McColl of the two-person theatre company, The Right Size.

References
 
 

1997 plays
Comedy plays
Fringe theatre
Laurence Olivier Award-winning plays
West End plays